Tibor Spitz (born 1929) is a Slovak-born artist and a Holocaust survivor. After escaping from communist Czechoslovakia to the West he lived and worked in Canada and the United States. He currently resides in Kingston, New York.

Biography
In 1929, Tibor Spitz was born in a small town called Dolný Kubín in the high mountains of northern Slovakia, at that time part of Czechoslovakia. His father was a cantor for the Jewish community and his mother was a teacher. He survived Holocaust at age 15, studied chemistry in Prague, and in 1968 escaped to the West to live in Canada and later in the United States. After his career as a scientist, he became a professional artist and lecturer on Holocaust.

Spitz was born in a Slovak part of Czechoslovakia that kept changing from democracy to a fascist Nazi regime followed by the Soviet-style communism.  Because of his Jewish origin, between the ages of 10 to 15, he was not allowed to attend public schools and for three years he was doomed to be either murdered on the spot or deported to a death camp in nearby Poland. He was 12 when almost all his deported relatives vanished without a trace in Nazi Death & Labor camps.  After merely surviving the Nazi era he wanted to study art as did his older brother. However, the already-established communist regime arranged for him to study chemistry. After graduation, he worked as an engineer, Ph.D. scientist, and glass technology expert in Czechoslovak glass industry Research and development institutions. In 1968 he was returning to complete his two years assignment in the Cuban glass industry when he and his wife Noemi (during an airplane refueling stop in Canada) escaped to the West. Nine years later they moved from Canada to the United States. 30 years in the glass industry had followed by 14 years working as a scientist developing hi-tech magnetic recording heads for computers and VCRs.

Suppressed memories of his tragic childhood required an outlet only art could fully provide. The Communist country where he lived for two decades would not tolerate it, while political freedoms in the West fully supported his free artistic expression. Next to his scientific and technical profession Tibor Spitz became simultaneously an active artist as well. The unusually creative artistic environment in both Kingston and nearby Woodstock, New York gradually turned him into a professional artist.  As his interest in art continued growing, besides painting he has been also sculpting, making ceramics, wood carvings, and wood burnings. When he discovered that impressionists have not fully exhausted all their artistic possibilities, his painting techniques gradually gravitated toward pointillism and neo-impressionism. Besides initial hounding faces and figurative scenes associated with Holocaust, Judaism, and Jewish mystical teachings Kabbalah, he also added fishing scenes, musicians, horses, still-life, and landscapes. College courses as well as directions from his mentor Meyer Lieberman were a great help in developing his artistic skills.

His art was exhibited in many solo and group shows. Galleries, museums, schools, and colleges as well as cultural, scientific, religious, and public institutions were interested in both his presentations and exhibitions.  During the last decades, solo exhibitions of his art were held numerous times in New York State, New Jersey, Canada, his native Slovakia, Prague, Art Society of Kingston, HCT, Gallery SEVEN21, and many others.  His last art exhibitions took place in his Slovak birthplace Dolny Kubin (2019)and at New Paltz NY Gallery UNISON in 2022.

In 1997 American art historian Matthew Baigell included his biography and reproduction of his painting in his book "Jewish-American artists and the Holocaust".  In 2008 Canadian drama director Valeria Thothova used his paintings in her book "Shalom" issued in Canada. His achievements were described in dozens of media reports published in several countries. A documentary movie titled "TIBOR SPITZ - Portraits of successful Slovaks abroad" (2015) was shown in both Slovakia, Canada, and Slovak Television.  In 2022 he was participating in a documentary film purchased by PBS and broadcast on 350 PBS TV channels in the USA and also in Canada and Europe.  Title, "WE REMEMBER - Songs of survivors" (April 2022).  In 2021 Noemi & Tibor Spitz published a small edition biographical book.

References

External links 

 Documentary film

1929 births
20th-century American painters
21st-century American painters
American male painters
Living people
Jewish concentration camp survivors
People from Dolný Kubín
Slovak painters
20th-century American male artists